Mountain View School can refer to:

 Mountain View High School (Mesa, Arizona)
 Mountain View High School (Pima County, Arizona)
 Mountain View School (Goleta, California)
 Mountain View High School (Mountain View, California)
 Mountain View School (Marion, North Carolina)
 Mountain View High School (Bend, Oregon)
 Mountain View High School (Utah), in Orem
 Mountain View High School (Virginia), in Stafford County
 Mountain View High School (Washington), in Vancouver
 Mountain View High School (Wyoming), in Mountain View, Wyoming
 Mountain View High School (Idaho), in Meridian
 Mountain View School (Russellville, Arkansas), listed on the National Register of Historic Places in Pope County, Arkansas
 Mountain View State School, Gatesville, Texas

See also
 Mountain View High School (disambiguation)